Olp is a hamlet within Sort municipal term, Pallars Sobirà, Catalonia, Spain.

This hamlet had only 46 inhabitants in 2006. It is located in the Pyrenees, at an altitude between 1,000 and 1,150 m.

References

External links
Pallars Sobirà Official website
Pallars Sobirà Tourism
IDESCAT: Pallars Sobirà
Wikiloc - El Batlliu de Sort (Sort-Olp-Pujalt-Enviny-Bressui-Sort)

Populated places in Pallars Sobirà